K47 may refer to:
 K-47 (Kansas highway)
 , a Flower-class corvette of the Royal Navy
 , a Veer-class corvette of the Indian Navy
 Keystone K-47 Pathfinder, an American airliner
 Junkers K 47, a Swedish fighter aircraft
 Potassium-47, an isotope of potassium
 Shiranuka Station, in Hokkaido, Japan
 Veni Sancte Spiritus (Mozart), by Wolfgang Amadeus Mozart